{{Automatic taxobox
|name = Pelargonium sp. Striatellum
|image = Pelargonium benambra.jpg
|status = EN 
|status_system = EPBC
|status_ref =  
|taxon = Pelargonium
|species_text = P. sp. Striatellum
|binomial_text = Pelargonium sp. Striatellum
|synonyms = *Pelargonium aff. rodneyanum (Lake Omeo)
Pelargonium benambra ms
Pelargonium sp. 1 
Pelargonium sp. (G. W. Carr 10345)
Pelargonium striatellum ms
}}Pelargonium sp. Striatellum, commonly known as Omeo stork's-bill''', is an undescribed species of Pelargonium'' that is endemic to Australia. It is listed as "endangered" under the Environment Protection and Biodiversity Conservation Act, "endangered" in New South Wales and "vulnerable" in Victoria. It exists in five known locations; four in New South Wales and another in Victoria. Other populations may exist undiscovered on private land.

References

sp. Striatellum
Flora of New South Wales
Flora of Victoria (Australia)
Undescribed plant species